St. Barnabas's Hospital (安国圣巴拿巴医院) is a hospital in Beijing, China founded by the Anglican Church of China. St. Barnabas and other Christian hospitals in China were taken over by the communist government after 1949.

References

Hospitals in Beijing
Hospitals with year of establishment missing